Marek Jerzy Minakowski is a Polish historian and genealogist known for creating the Polish genealogy database Wielka Genealogia Minakowskiego.

Early life and career 
Minakowski earned his PhD in classical philosophy at the Jagiellonian University, Kraków. Initially focusing on classical philosophy and logics, he later started publishing about Poland's history and genealogy. In 2001, he founded a genealogy website Wielka Genealogia Minakowskiego and began adding available historical records. By 2020, the site contained genealogy records of around 1 million people.

In 2016, in recognition of his work, he received the Decoration of Honor Meritorious for Polish Culture.

Personal life 
In 1994, he married archaeologist Anna Barbara Lebet (born 1963), with whom he has one daughter.

References

External links 
 TEDxWarsaw – Marek Minakowski – 3/5/10 YouTube [English]
 Marek Jerzy Minakowski at Ludzie nauki nauka-polska.pl [Polish]

1972 births
Living people
Jagiellonian University alumni
People from Olsztyn
Polish bloggers
Male bloggers
Polish genealogists
20th-century Polish historians
Polish male non-fiction writers